Crib bridges were made from horizontally placed logs. The logs were laid first lengthwise, and then crosswise, in several layers. This consumed more trees than building trestle bridges, but they were easier to build without cranes or rams.

Less common are crib bridges made from stone, such as the Bailey Island Bridge.

See also 
 Crib pier

Bridges by structural type
Wooden bridges